Jon Anders Lindstad (born 4 July 1994) is a Norwegian freestyle skier. He competed in halfpipe at the FIS World Championships in 2011 and 2013. He competed at the 2014 Winter Olympics in Sochi, in halfpipe.

References

External links

1994 births
Living people
Freestyle skiers at the 2014 Winter Olympics
Norwegian male freestyle skiers
Olympic freestyle skiers of Norway